The Port of Jiangyin is a natural inland port located at Jiangyin, Wuxi Prefecture, Jiangsu, People's Republic of China. The port had a container throughput of 1,001,000 TEU in 2013

Setting
The Port of Jiangyin is located in the plain between the river and the Lake Tai.

Layout
The Port has 7 deep-water berths, capable of handling ships of up to 100,000 DWT.

References

 

Ports and harbours of China
Jiangyin